Karen Lynch may refer to:

Karen S. Lynch (born 1963), president and chief executive officer of CVS Health
Karen Lynch (author) (born 1967), author of young adult urban fantasy novels